Maisa Abd Elhadi (born 15 November 1985) is an Palestinian Arab actress. Abd Elhadi won the best actress award at the Dubai Film Festival in 2011.

She was reportedly wounded by Israeli forces while taking part in a peaceful demonstration  in the city of Haifa on 9 May 2021 protesting against forced expulsions of Palestinian families from their homes in the East Jerusalem neighborhood of Sheikh Jarrah.

Selected filmography
 Eyes of a Thief (2014)
 The Worthy (2016)
 The Angel (2018)
 The Reports on Sarah and Saleem (2018)
 Tel Aviv on Fire (2018)
 Baghdad Central (2020)
 Huda's Salon (2021)

References

External links 

1985 births
Palestinian actresses
Living people
21st-century Palestinian actresses
Palestinian film actresses